Revista Austral de Ciencias Sociales is a biannual peer-reviewed academic journal specialising in social science, including fields such as history and archaeology. It was established in 1997 and is published by the Austral University of Chile. The journal is abstracted and indexed in Scopus, Redalyc, and Latindex.

External links 
 

Multidisciplinary social science journals
Publications established in 1997
Austral University of Chile academic journals
Biannual journals
Spanish-language journals
1997 establishments in Chile